Ngororero is a town in Rwanda.

Location
Ngororero is located in Ngororero District, Western Province, in northwestern Rwanda. The coordinates of the town are:1° 51' 54.00"S, 29° 37' 30.00"E (Latitude:-1.8650; Longitude: 29.6250).

Overview
Ngororero is a small town in Ngororero District, Rwanda. The town serves as the district headquarters. Despite its small size, it is served by three commercial banks, namely: (a) Banque Populaire du Rwanda SA (b) Unguka Microfinance Bank and (c) Bank of Kigali.

Population
The current population of the town of Ngororero is 34,559.

Points of interest
The following points of interest lie within the town limits or close to the edges of town:

 The offices of Ngororero Town Council
 The headquarters of Ngororero District Administration
 Ngororero Central Market
 A branch of Banque Populaire du Rwanda SA
 A branch of Bank of Kigali
 A branch of Unguka Bank

See also
 Kigali
 Provinces of Rwanda
 Districts of Rwanda
 List of banks in Rwanda

References

External links
Website of Western Province, Rwanda (Kinyarwanda) & (English)

Ngororero District
Western Province, Rwanda
Populated places in Rwanda